This page describes the qualification procedure for EuroBasket Women 2013. The Qualifying Round was held from June 12 to July 14, 2012. The top 2 teams in each group qualified for the 2013 edition.

Qualifying round

Qualifying

Group A

Group B

Group C

Group D

Group E

References

External links 
 EuroBasket Women 2013

EuroBasket Women qualification
EuroBasket Women 2013
2011–12 in European women's basketball